The 2013 USASA Region IV National Cup is a qualifying tournament that will determine which clubs from the fourth region of the United States Adult Soccer Association qualify for the first round proper of the 2013 U.S. Open Cup. The Region IV National Cup will take place 19–20 April 2013 with the final taking place on 21 April 2013.

Qualification 
 Cal FC (CA-South)
 Doxa Italia (CA-South)
 DV8 Defenders (CA-North)
 Internationalists (CA-South)
 PSA Elite (CA-South)
 San Francisco City (CA-North)

Matches 
The group winners will advance to the US Open Cup.

Group A

Group B

See also 
 2013 U.S. Open Cup
 2013 U.S. Open Cup qualification
 United States Adult Soccer Association

References

External links 

2013 U.S. Open Cup
2013
2012